Audre "Pinny" Cooke (December 26, 1923 – August 1, 2004) was an American social activist and politician from New York.

Life
She was born Audre Trupin on December 26, 1923, in Syracuse, New York. There she attended Nottingham High School. She graduated from Ohio State University, as B.S. in 1946, and M.S. in 1948. In 1945, she married Henry F. Cooke (1922–2005), and they had three children. They lived in Rochester.

Pinny Cooke became active in social and charitable work, and entered politics as a Republican. On February 14, 1978, she was elected to the New York State Assembly, to fill the vacancy caused by the appointment of Thomas R. Fey as Director of State Operations. She was re-elected several times, and remained in the Assembly until 1990, sitting in the 182nd, 183rd, 184th, 185th, 186th, 187th and 188th New York State Legislatures.

She died on August 1, 2004, at her home in Rochester, New York;  and was buried at the Mount Hope Cemetery there.

References

Further reading

External links

1923 births
2004 deaths
Politicians from Syracuse, New York
Politicians from Rochester, New York
Republican Party members of the New York State Assembly
Women state legislators in New York (state)
Ohio State University alumni
Burials at Mount Hope Cemetery (Rochester)
20th-century American politicians
20th-century American women politicians
Activists from Rochester, New York
21st-century American women